The 1946–47 BAA season was the inaugural season of the Basketball Association of America. The league launched with 11 teams playing a 60-game schedule. The postseason tournament (the 1947 BAA Playoffs) at its conclusion, ended with the Philadelphia Warriors becoming the first BAA Champion, beating the Chicago Stags 4 games to 1 in the BAA Finals.

Following its third, the 1948–49 season, the BAA and National Basketball League merged to create the National Basketball Association or NBA. The NBA recognizes the three BAA seasons as part of its own history, sometimes without comment, so the 1946–47 BAA season is sometimes considered the first NBA season.

By 1951, only three original BAA teams were still in the NBA: the Boston Celtics, New York Knicks and Philadelphia Warriors (now in San Francisco as the Golden State Warriors). All members of the inaugural Western Division had folded by 1950, with three of them lasting one season (Detroit Falcons, Pittsburgh Ironmen, Cleveland Rebels). In addition, the Toronto Huskies also folded following the season, making a total of four teams folding before the BAA's second season.

Notable events

On November 1, 1946, in the inaugural game of the new league, the New York Knicks beat the Toronto Huskies 68–66 in front of 7,090 spectators at Maple Leaf Gardens in Toronto.  Ossie Schectman scored the opening basket for the New York Knicks against Toronto.  In 1949, the BAA helped create the National Basketball Association by merger, and Schectman's shot may be considered the first basket in NBA history. The NBA recognizes the three BAA seasons as part of its own history, sometimes without comment.

Final standings

Eastern Division

Western Division

Playoffs

There were no byes. Western and Eastern champions Chicago and Washington immediately played a long semifinal series with Washington having home-court advantage. Chicago won the sixth game in Washington one day before Philadelphia concluded its two short series with other runners-up.

Statistics leaders

Note: Prior to the 1969–70 season, league leaders in points and assists were determined by totals rather than averages.

BAA awards

All-BAA First Team
G Max Zaslofsky, Chicago Stags
F Bones McKinney, Washington Capitols
F Joe Fulks, Philadelphia Warriors
C Stan Miasek, Detroit Falcons
F Bob Feerick, Washington Capitols
All-BAA Second Team
G John Logan, St. Louis Bombers
G Ernie Calverley, Providence Steamrollers
C Chick Halbert, Chicago Stags
G Frankie Baumholtz, Cleveland Rebels
G Fred Scolari, Washington Capitols

Notes

References